A total lunar eclipse took place on Sunday, June 3, 1928.

Visibility
It was completely visible over Asia, Australia and the Americas, seen rising over Asia and Australia and setting over the Americas.

Related lunar eclipses

Saros series

It last occurred on May 24, 1910 and will next occur on June 14, 1946.

This is the 33rd member of Lunar Saros 129. The previous event was the May 1910 lunar eclipse. The next event is the June 1946 lunar eclipse. Lunar Saros 129 contains 11 total lunar eclipses between 1910 and 2090. Solar Saros 136 interleaves with this lunar saros with an event occurring every 9 years 5 days alternating between each saros series.

Half-Saros cycle
A lunar eclipse will be preceded and followed by solar eclipses by 9 years and 5.5 days (a half saros). This lunar eclipse is related to two total solar eclipses of Solar Saros 136.

See also
List of lunar eclipses
List of 20th-century lunar eclipses

Notes

External links

1928-06
1928 in science